Joe Courtney may refer to:

Joseph Courtney (American football), Boston college football coach (1911)
Joe Courtney (basketball) (born 1969), American basketball player
Joe Courtney (politician) (born 1953), U.S. Representative for Connecticut
Tedda Courtney (Joseph Edward Courtney, 1883–1957), Australian rugby league footballer and coach

See also
Joel Courtney